Clay Cross is a town and a civil parish in the North East Derbyshire district of Derbyshire, England.
It is directly on the A61. Surrounding settlements include North Wingfield, Tupton, Pilsley and Ashover.

History
The High Street was built over a pre-dating Roman road, that may have been called Rykneild Street, where a tollhouse (1786-1876) was situated. The discovery of coal in the area, introduced the village to the Industrial Revolution. Packhorses at first transported the 'blackgold' over the Peaks on a turnpike road opened in 1756 between the iron foundries of Derby and Sheffield. Until the early 19th century, Clay Cross was a small village known as Clay Lane, but increasing demand for coal and other minerals trebled the population by 1840 , the oldest building being the George and Dragon Inn. While driving the tunnel for the North Midland Railway, George Stephenson discovered both coal and iron, which together with the demand for limestone, caused him to move into Tapton Hall, near Chesterfield, and set up business as George Stephenson and Co.

A map of 1833 showed Thanet Street and Clay Lane. The railway 'mania' of 1840s witnessed expansion northwards facilitated by the Clay Cross tunnel dug in 1837–38. Whilst tunnelling over a mile underground they discovered vast quantities of commercial grade coal. Clay Cross became a boom town. The 'Liverpool Party' of Stephenson engineers formed the Clay Cross Company in 1839 which they funded from their considerable resources. As well as sinking a number of shafts with colliery support, there were coke oven works, brickworks, limeworks, irons furnaces and foundry. The ductile pipe was developed into an internationally sold product, making Clay Cross renowned for its iron and coal industry worldwide. Although the company had been formed to mine coal and manufacture coke from the railway, the supplies from Durham were preferred, and the works turned to iron working and brick making. When Stephenson died in 1848 his son, Robert, took over, leaving the company in 1852 when it became formally known by the name of the Clay Cross Company. In 1871 the Jackson family acquired 100% of the stocks and shares. They continued as owners until 1974. For many years, the company was the town's major employer. In 1985 Biwater took it over. In December 2000 Biwater sold the site to French company, Saint-Gobain. Some months later, it was closed down with the loss of around 750 jobs. Demolition of the vast Biwater site began in late 2008, and new houses and shops are appearing in the town.

In 1925 the Ashover Light Railway was opened to transport minerals from the quarries at Ashover Butts to the Clay Cross Company at Egstow. The passenger services on the narrow gauge line were closed in 1936 and the mineral traffic ceased in 1950.

Industrial architecture
In 1840 the Stephensons built Eldon House as its office headquarters, which latterly was converted into a private dwelling-house. The Stephensons also built more than 400 miners' cottages. In addition they set up elementary schools and consecrated new churches. The company provided the town with almost all its energy needs in gas and electricity. The largest house Clay Cross Hall was built in 1845 for the company's General Manager Charles Binns. Stephenson's workers' houses were of high quality for their time, having four rooms compared to the normal two. By 1850 there were three chapels, a church and an institute - but no constable. One such construction of 1847 was the Wesleyan Chapel in use until at least 1900 on Holmgate Road. They also provided a company bowling green with a clubhouse. A Mechanics Institute was opened which was handed over to the Clay Lane Urban Districts School Board in 1893. The Board's Senior School for Boys was opened in 1884, converted to a junior school in the 1930s and still teaches in 2015. During the late Victorian era middle class villa style houses were also built in a new part of the town.

Colliery owner Thomas Houldsworth, also a churchwarden for 25 years, built Alma House which stood in extensive parklands. The house was surrounded by railings and flat roof of indeterminate date. He was responsible developer of Clay Cross pits until 1850, and then the Alma Colliery in North Wingfield, after the Crimean War.

Springfield House was built by the Clay Cross Company for engineer William Howe by the company. He was the resident from 1866 until his death in 1872. An even earlier event was Hill House built by 1833 it was purchased by the North Midland Railway Company in 1837 as an office for resident engineer Frederick Swanwick. When the tunnel was completed, Swanwick left town, but the house was passed to engineers James Campbell and William Howe, and by the 1860s, Dr. Wilson, the local medical practitioner was in residence.

The North Midland Railway tunnel sank nine ventilator shafts through which smoke wafted across the Peaks. Clay Cross is situated at the highest point on the line 361 feet above sea level, when it opened in 1840. A narrow gauge line transported coal up the incline to the works. Another mile north along the 'Black Path' was Clay Cross railway station, between the halts at Tupton and Hepthorne Lane.

Religion
The Anglican church of St Bartholomew had been built and consecrated in 1851. Six years later a spire was added. The Rev. Joseph Oldham and his wife, Emma were the first conscientious incumbents. Her brother was radical designer and founder of the Arts and Crafts movement, William Morris. Morris was commissioned to install a saintly stained glass window.

Other places of worship in Clay Cross are:
 Methodist Church on High Street.
 Baptist Church on Market Street (now closed).
 Clay Cross Community Church - C4 (Assemblies of God) on Market Street.
 Roman Catholic Church of St. Patrick and St. Bridget on Thanet Street.
 Holmgate Evangelical Church on Valley Road, Holmgate.
 Salvation Army on Thanet Street.
 St Barnabas Church, an Anglican congregation meeting at the St Barnabas Centre on Pilsley Road, Danesmoor.
 Community of Christ on Thanet Street.

Danesmoor Cemetery and Parkhouse Memorial
Parkhouse Colliery Memorial in Danesmoor Cemetery stands today as testament to a disaster. In November 1882 an underground explosion brought the collapse of the pit shaft causing the death of 45 men and boys. Many of their families lived in company housing at Pleasant Row, Chapel Row, Cellar Row and Gaffers Row. Also known as Egstow Terrace, this last street was built in 1846, was considered of better average quality housing.

Co-operative
The Clay Cross Pioneer Industrial Co-operative Society's first shop was opened on the corner of the High Street and Market Street. It was an early member of the Co-operative Movement founded in Rochdale by John Bright that spread rapidly across the North of England. The Co-operative Society archives say that the Clay Cross Pioneer Industrial Society merged with the Chesterfield & District Co-operative Society in 1915.

Housing Finance Act dispute

The town was an urban district until 1974, when it was merged into the North East Derbyshire district under the Local Government Act 1972. In the 1970s the council achieved brief notoriety due to its refusal to implement the Housing Finance Act 1972 in increasing the rents of council housing: by law the rents should have increased by £1 a week from October 1972. The council was one of several to show defiance against the Act and of three to be ordered to comply by the Department of the Environment in November 1972 (the others being Eccles and Halstead). Clay Cross UDC was threatened with an audit in December 1972. The constituency Labour party barred the eleven councillors from its list of approved candidates. The District Auditor ordered the eleven Labour Party councillors to pay a surcharge of £635 each in January 1973, finding them 'guilty of negligence and misconduct'. Conisbrough UDC faced a similar audit on 19 January 1973.

The UDC made an appeal in the case to the High Court. Clydebank and Cumbernauld abandoned similar actions in March 1973. The surcharge was upheld by the High Court on 30 July 1973, which also added a further £2,000 legal costs to their bill, as well as barring them from public office for five years. The council further defied authority (the Pay Board) in August, when they decided to increase council workers' earnings. This provoked a further dispute with NALGO. Ultimately, the dispute became moot with the replacement of Clay Cross Urban District Council with the North East Derbyshire District Council from 1 April 1974. The councillors were made bankrupt in 1975.

A book on the dispute between the council and the government, The Story of Clay Cross, was written by one of the councillors, David Skinner and the journalist Julia Langdon. The book was published by Spokesman Books in 1974.

Local economy and transport
Clay Cross has a large modern business park called Coney Green Business Park and is located between Egstow and Danesmoor.
There is a community hospital on the A6175 Market Street. Danesmoor Industrial Estate close to the former site of the Parkhouse Colliery. The town's  library is on Holmgate Road.
Clay Cross town centre is currently undergoing a £22m redevelopment which has so far included a new supermarket, new bus station and new relief road. The second phase of this is due to start which will see a new parade of shops plus a new medical centre. Eventually the site of the former junior and infant schools which is located in the town centre will be redeveloped.

M1 motorway junction 29 is five miles away. The nearest railway stations are Chesterfield (6 miles) and Alfreton. Clay Cross station closed as part of the Beeching cuts in 1967. In 2017, a Stagecoach in Chesterfield bus connecting Clay Cross to Chesterfield railway station was introduced. A passenger railway line runs in a tunnel under the town without stopping.

There has been talk of providing a motorway spur to the town in the past. To ease chronic congestion on the A61, which has seen traffic grow by 10% in the past few years, there is talk of a dual carriageway bypassing Clay Cross and Tupton before joining the A617 near Hasland, heading North West to Horns Bridge.

Education
Tupton Hall School is in Tupton and located about one mile to the north of Clay Cross. Previously Clay Cross had a secondary school located in Market Street, and a junior school located off High Street. The junior and infant schools were merged and moved to a new purpose built complex on Pilsley Road Danesmoor and renamed Sharley Park Community Primary School. The site of the former schools has been cleared and is awaiting development.
The secondary school was closed in 1969 and transferred to Tupton Hall as part of the Government's drive to comprehensive education, it is now one of the largest with around 2,000 pupils, including a sixth form centre. Clay Cross Secondary School was converted to an adult education centre.

Sport

Leisure centre

Sharley Park Leisure Centre, on the A6175, Market Street, has swimming, gym and sports hall facilities.

Football
Five football clubs from the town, all now extinct, have competed in the FA Cup over the years -
 Clay Cross Town FC (1874)
 Clay Cross Zingari FC
 Clay Cross Town FC (1909)
 Clay Cross & Danesmoor Welfare FC
 Biwater FC (formerly Clay Cross Works FC)

The town's current team, the third to be called Clay Cross Town, play in the Central Midlands Football League, and played in the FA Vase for the first time in 2016.

Demography
In the 2011 census, Clay Cross was 97.7% White, 1.1% Asian, 0.8% Mixed (multiple), and 0.2% Black.

Notable residents

 Dennis Skinner was born and grew up in the town, and went to Tupton Hall Grammar School. He first worked at Parkhouse Colliery (known as Catty Pit) in 1949, a mile to the east of Clay Cross. The pit closed in 1962. He was a Clay Cross councillor from 1960 to 1970, directly before becoming an MP in 1970.
 Eddie Shimwell, FA Cup winner, licensee of the Royal Volunteer in Clay Cross.
 Arthur Henderson, Nobel Peace Prize winner in 1934, when he was MP for Clay Cross. Thrice leader of the Labour Party.
 Sir George Kenning (1880–1956) was a Derbyshire entrepreneur who grew the family business from a corner hardware shop in Clay Cross to a nationwide car dealership that employed around 2,000 people. Kenning became one of the early pioneers in selling, servicing and financing the use of motor vehicles by industry, commerce and individuals. George Kenning was very active in public life. He served on the now defunct Clay Cross Urban District council as well as being a councillor and alderman on Derbyshire County Council. He was an active member of the Methodist Church in Clay Cross. Kenning also provided a recreation ground for use by the people of Clay Cross. This was named "Kenning Park" and is located on Holmgate Road to the west of the town. As a result of his contribution to public life, the Alderman George Kenning, JP, was appointed Knight Bachelor in the 1943 New Year Honours List "for public services in Derbyshire". He then became known as "Sir George Kenning".

See also
 Listed buildings in Clay Cross
 List of places in Derbyshire
 Ashover Light Railway

References

Bibliography
 Heritage Clay Cross Trail leaflet, Derbyshire County Council (2015)
 Victoria County History, North Derbyshire

External links

 Clay Cross Parish Council
 Discover Derbyshire
 Clay Cross Genealogy and Local History

Civil parishes in Derbyshire
Towns in Derbyshire
North East Derbyshire District